1-(2-Diphenyl)piperazine, also known as RA-7, is a drug which acts as a potent and selective antagonist at the 5HT serotonin receptor. It was discovered as an active metabolite of the synthetic 5-HT agonists LP-12 and LP-211, and unexpectedly turned out to be a potent antagonist with selectivity approaching that of the parent molecules, despite its much simpler structure.

See also
 Benzylpiperazine
 Naphthylpiperazine
 Phenylpiperazine

References

Serotonin receptor agonists
Phenylpiperazines